Nova Express is a 1964 novel by William S. Burroughs.

Nova Express may also refer to:

 Nova Express (album), a 2011 album by John Zorn
 Nova Express (fanzine), a 1987—2002 American science fiction fanzine
 Nova Express, a 1969–1970 Australian band featuring Linda George
 Nova Express, a fictional magazine, for which Douglas Roth is a reporter, in the 	1986–1987 graphic novel Watchmen
 Nova Express, a fictional drug in the Japanese manga Ultra Heaven
 Nova Express Café, a defunct restaurant in Los Angeles, California, U.S.